Johnny & June is a compilation album and 60th overall album by American country singer Johnny Cash, released on Bear Family Records in 1978 (see 1978 in music).  Like The Unissued Johnny Cash it consists of material that was either unreleased or not widely available.  Most of the songs were recorded from 1964 to 1965, with the exception of "Smiling Bill McCall" from 1960.  The songs, "Cotton Picking Hands" and "Wer Kennt Den Weg" and "In Virginia" (both in German) had been previously released on singles.  "Thunderball" was recorded for the James Bond film, but was ultimately turned down in favor of Tom Jones (see also the 'Thunderball film and soundtrack articles). 

"One Too Many Mornings" is a Bob Dylan song from The Times They Are a-Changin'.  Cash and Dylan would later (unsuccessfully) attempt a duet version of the song for Nashville Skyline, and Cash would record the song again for Heroes'' with Waylon Jennings.  This version features Maybelle Carter playing autoharp.  The Carters feature on several songs on the album; June Carter sings lead vocal on three songs and duets on another, and Anita Carter sings on "That's What It's Like to Be Lonesome."

Track listing

1978 compilation albums
Johnny Cash compilation albums
Bear Family Records compilation albums